The Tangent is a progressive rock group formed in 2002.

History

Formation
The band was formed in 2002 by Parallel or 90 Degrees keyboardists Andy Tillison and Sam Baine and multi-instrumentalist Guy Manning; The Flower Kings' guitarist Roine Stolt, bassist Jonas Reingold, and drummer Zoltan Csörsz; and renowned saxophonist David Jackson of Van der Graaf Generator. The band was scheduled only to be a "one-off" side project but has produced ten official studio albums and a number of live albums since.

The Tangent has had numerous changes in personnel resulting in Tillison being the only member to have been on all the recordings.

Live performances
Since 2003 the band in its various forms has played concerts and festivals in the US, UK, Germany, The Netherlands, Sweden and France. Members of the band also occasionally appear as special guests on stage with other artists. On 13 February 2012 guitarist Luke Machin joined Pain of Salvation on stage at The Garage in London, England, playing on the song Kingdom of Loss.

Cover art
The band had much of their cover art done by artist Ed Unitsky, who worked closely with the band when designing their album artwork. Ed has completed five album covers for The Tangent.

The outer cover artwork for the band’s 2020 ‘Auto Reconnaissance’ album was again provided by Unitsky while the inner sleeve art was created by newcomer Sara Mirabbasi.

Cover artwork for the album Not as Good as the Book (2008) was created by French artist Antoine Ettori, for Down and Out in Paris and London (2009) by mbl graphics.

Personnel

Current members

Studio band from the latest release, Auto Reconnaissance in 2020: 

 Andy Tillison (keyboards, vocals)
 Theo Travis (saxophone, flute, duduk)
 Luke Machin (guitar)
 Jonas Reingold (bass guitar, vocals)
 Steve Roberts (drums)

Former members
 Roine Stolt (guitars, vocals)
 Jakko Jakszyk (guitars, vocals)
 Göran Edman (vocals)
 Krister Jonsson (guitars)
 David Zackrisson (guitars)
 David Million (guitar)
 Dan Watts (guitar)
 Sam Baine (keyboards, piano, vocals)
 Rikard Sjöblom (keyboards, vocals)
 Lindsay Frost (keyboards)
 Lalle Larsson (keyboards)
 Marie-Eve de Gaultier (keyboards, vocals)
 Robert Hansen (bass guitar)
 Jonathan Barrett (bass guitar, vocals)
 Dan Mash (bass guitar, vocals)
 Simon Albone (bass guitar)
 Dave Albone (drums)
 Zoltan Csörsz (drums)
 Jaime Salazar (drums)
 Magnus Östgren (drums)
 Paul Burgess (drums)
 Michael Gilbourne (drums)
 Nick Rickwood (drums)
 Tony "Funkytoe" Latham (drums)
 Gavin Harrison (drums)
 Morgan Ågren (drums)
 David Jackson (saxophone, flute)
 Guy Manning (acoustic guitar, bouzouki, mandolin, keyboards, vocals)
 Julie King (vocals)
 David Longdon (vocals)

Discography

Studio albums 
 The Music That Died Alone (2003)
 The World That We Drive Through (2004)
 A Place in the Queue (2006)
 Not as Good as the Book (2008)
 Down and Out in Paris and London (2009)
 COMM (2011)
 Le Sacre du Travail (2013)
 A Spark in the Aether (2015)
 The Slow Rust of Forgotten Machinery (2017)
 Proxy (2018)
 Auto Reconnaissance (2020)
 Songs From the Hard Shoulder (2022)

Live albums 
 Pyramids and Stars (2005)
 Going Off on One (2007)
 Going Off on Two (2010)
 London or Paris, Berlin or Southend On Sea (2012)
 Hotel Cantaffordit (with Karmakanic as Tangekanic) (2018)

Compilation albums 
 A Place on the Shelf - a special enthusiast's collection (2009)
 ''L%27Etagère du Travail (2013)

References

External links
Official website

Rock music supergroups
English progressive rock groups
Musical groups established in 2002
2002 establishments in England
Inside Out Music artists